The 2020 Waterford Senior Hurling Championship was the 120th staging of the Waterford Senior Hurling Championship since its establishment by the Waterford County Board in 1897. The original championship draw took place on 21 January 2020, however, due to the coronavirus pandemic in Ireland the draws for a rescheduled championship took place on 15 June 2020 with a new format being adopted and relegation being abolished. The championship took place between 24 July and 30 August 2020.

Ballygunner were the defending champions.

On 30 August 2020, Ballygunner won the championship after a 1-23 to 0-09 defeat of Passage in the final at Walsh Park. This was their 19th championship title overall and their seventh title in succession.

Lismore's Maurice Shanahan was the championship's top scorer with 3-44.

Team changes

To Championship

Promoted from the Waterford Intermediate Hurling Championship
 Ballysaggart

From Championship

Relegated to the Waterford Intermediate Hurling Championship
 Ballyduff Upper

Results/fixtures

Group A

Table

Results

Group B

Table

Results

Group C

Table

Results

Group D

Table

Results

Knockout stage

Quarter-finals

Semi-finals

Final

Championship statistics

Top scorers

Overall

In a single game

References

Waterford Senior Hurling Championship
Waterford
Waterford Senior Hurling Championship